Hyalophora cecropia, the cecropia moth, is North America's largest native moth. It is a member of the family Saturniidae, or giant silk moths. Females have been documented with a wingspan of five to seven inches (160 mm) or more. These moths can be found all across North America as far west as Washington and north into the majority of Canadian provinces. Cecropia moth larvae are most commonly found on maple trees, but they have also been found on cherry and birch trees among many others. The species was first described by Carl Linnaeus in his 1758 10th edition of Systema Naturae.

Life cycle

Like other members of the giant silk moth family, the adult cecropia moth lacks functional mouth parts and a digestive system. Due to this, they survive approximately two weeks.

To find a mate, the female cecropia moth emits pheromones which the male detects with its sensitive antennae. Male cecropia moths can detect these pheromones from up to a mile away, although a male may fly up to 7 miles while searching for a female. Mating typically begins early in the morning hours and lasts until the evening.

After mating, the female will lay up to one hundred eggs. These eggs are a mottled reddish brown and are usually found on either side of a host leaf. These eggs will eventually hatch into tiny black caterpillars.

There are typically five larval instars (developmental stages), each lasting approximately one week. The first instar larvae are black. Their coloration is due to small black hairs growing from tubercles (small projections) all over their body. These larvae feed upon many common trees and shrubs including maple, birch, and apple. As the caterpillars grow larger into the second larval instar, they become yellow green. During the third, fourth, and fifth instars, the cecropia moth becomes rather large and bluish green. At these final stages, the tubercles become blue, yellow or orange, depending on location on the body, while the black hairs are eventually lost.

Once the caterpillars reach maturity, they spin large brown cocoons longways on trees or wooden structures. They will then emerge as adults in the first two weeks of seasonally warm weather in early summer. Hyalophora cecropia moths are univoltine, having only one generation per year.

Upon reaching adulthood, their size is variable. The cecropia moth's wings are brownish with red near the base of the forewing. There are crescent-shaped spots of red with whitish centers on all wings, but are larger on the hindwings. All wings have whitish coloration followed by reddish bands of shading beyond the postmedial line that runs longitudinally down the center of all four wings. The body is hairy, with reddish coloring on the anterior, and fading to reddish/whitish. The abdomen has alternating bands of red and white.

Threats
Pests of the moths have become a significant problem.

Parasitoids, such as some species of wasps and flies, lay their eggs in or on the young caterpillars. The eggs then hatch into larvae, which consume the internal organs and muscles of the caterpillars. The parasitoid releases chemicals that override the regulatory mechanisms of the caterpillar. Once the parasitoid has grown enough, it induces the caterpillar to pupate. Once the caterpillars pupate, the parasitoid larvae themselves pupate, killing the cecropia pupa.

Squirrels also consume the pupae of cecropia moths, which can decrease the populations significantly.

Pruning of trees and leaving outdoor lights on at night can also be detrimental to cecropia moths.

Compsilura concinnata, introduced to North America to control invasive European gypsy moths, is a particular threat to the native North American cecropia moth.

In science
The original description of the insect juvenile hormone by Carroll Williams in Nature in 1956 is from the cecropia silkworm. This large insect had enough juvenile hormone in its abdomen to permit extraction of detectable amounts from a single specimen.

In the media
In August 2012, a cecropia moth caterpillar was accidentally imported from Ontario to St. John's, Newfoundland, via a shipment of dogwood shrubs. Cecropia are not native to the latter province. Within 48 hours of its arrival the caterpillar began spinning a cocoon; it wintered at the federal Agriculture and Agri-Food research facility in St. John's, whence it had been transferred by the owner of the importing company. On May 29, 2013, the predominantly black and red female moth — named Georgina by the facility's staff — emerged from her cocoon with a roughly  wingspan. After allowing Georgina to complete her natural lifespan, researchers planned to pin and preserve her for future study.

Life cycle gallery

References

External links

Picture journal of cecropia development (warning, it may take a while to load)
The cecropia moth
Video presentation of mating cecropia moths. One had just emerged from and was still on its cocoon: , 
Cecropia moth on the UF / IFAS Featured Creatures Web site

Hyalophora
Moths of North America
Moths described in 1758
Taxa named by Carl Linnaeus